Controlled-access highways in Hungary are dual carriageways, grade separated with controlled-access, designed for high speeds. The legislation amendments define two types of highways: motorways and expressways.

According to Magyar Közút Nonprofit Zrt. (Hungarian Public Roads Ltd.; a state-owned enterprise responsible for the operation and maintenance of public roads in the country), the total length of the Hungarian highway system was 1,855 kilometers in 2022. The construction of the Hungarian highway system started in 1964 with M7, which connected Budapest with Lake Balaton by 1975. The total length of the system reached a milestone of 200 km in 1980, surpassed 500 km in 1998 and 1000 km in 2007.

As of July, 2022, the Hungarian highway network comprises 26 highways (13 motorways and 13 expressways), 12 of which (M1, M5, M7, M15, M19, M25, M30, M31, M35, M43, M51 and M70) have reached their total planned length.

Technical parameters 
Road signs are white shield on blue and the abbreviation for both types of highways is M.

  Motorways are public roads with controlled access which are designated for motor vehicles only, and feature two carriageways with at least two continuous lanes each with paved emergency lanes, divided by a median. They have no one-level intersections with any roads or other forms of land and water transport. They are equipped with roadside rest areas, which are intended only for the users of the motorway.

  Expressways share most of the characteristics of motorways, differing mainly in that:

 Expressways may be built without paved emergency lanes.
 Expressways are designated for lower speed than motorways. For example, the road curvature can be higher and the lanes are usually narrower (3.5m vs 3.75m).
 Expressways can have a single carriageway on sections with low traffic density.

Speed limits

Highway system

Motorways and Expressways
The following is a list of all existing and/or under construction highways in Hungary.

Major motorways

M1

The M1 starts from the western part of Budapest, it connects the Hungarian capital with Győr and northwestern part of Hungary, towards Vienna. The motorway is part of the Pan-European Corridor IV, and European route E60, E65 and E75. Average daily traffic is 75,510 near Budapest and 56,421 vehicles/day near Győr. The construction of the motorway began 1964, it took more than thirty years to reach Hegyeshalom and the Austrian border. Its significance has increased since the change of regime in 1990, and today it is the most important western connection in Hungary.

Main junctions:
 M1-M85 Győr-west, towards to Sopron and Szombathely (M86)*
 M1-M15 Mosonmagyaróvár-west, toward to Bratislava

M3

The M3 starts from north-eastern part of Budapest, it connects the Hungarian capital with Nyíregyháza and northeast part of Hungary, towards Mukachevo. The motorway is part of the Venice-Trieste-Ljubljana-Budapest-Lviv-Kyiv line Central-East Europe Corridor V, and European route E71, E79, E573 and E579. This is one of the most important route of the Hungarian motorway and road network, the southwest-north-eastern diagonal main line of traffic forming part of Budapest. Through Ukraine, Eastern Europe, and through Slovakia, creates a highway connection to the countries of north-eastern Europe.

Main junctions:
 M3-M30 Emőd, toward to Miskolc and Košice
 M3-M35 Görbeháza, toward to Debrecen and Oradea (M4)

M5

The M5 starts from Budapest, it connects the Hungarian capital with Szeged and southeast part of Hungary, towards Belgrade.
It was the third motorway in Hungary that reached the border. The motorway is part of the Pan-European Corridor X, and European route E75.
The motorway was built in the 1980s and reached the Serbian border in March 2006.

Main junctions:
 M5-M43 Szeged-north, toward to Makó and Arad-Timișoara

M6

The M6 starts from Budapest (M0-M6 Interchange), it connects the Hungarian capital with Mohács, on the right bank of the Danube in the south, towards Osijek and Sarajevo.
The motorway is part of the European route E73. The final section reaching the border is currently under construction with a planned opening date in 2024. The connecting Croatian section is scheduled to be delivered a year earlier.

Main junctions:
 M6-M8 Dunaújváros-south, toward to Veszprém and Kecskemét
 M6-M60 Bóly, toward to Pécs

M7

The M7 starts from western part of Budapest, it connects the Hungarian capital with Lake Balaton and southwestern part of Hungary, towards Zagreb. The motorway is part of the Pan-European Corridor V, and European route E71. Average daily traffic is 62,779 near Budapest and 49,273 vehicles/day near Székesfehérvár. The motorway was built in the 1960s and reached the Croatian border in October 2008.

Main junctions:
 M7-M70 Letenye, toward to Maribor and Venice

Gallery

Planned Highways
List of planned highways (motorways and expressways)

Rapid Roads
A third tier of highways, called 'Rapid Road' (in Hungarian: Gyorsút), was introduced in a 2015 Government Decree. Rapid roads were defined as dual carriageways with lower standards than that of an expressway, and the level intersection (e.g., traffic light node, roundabout) is permissible. Similarly to expressways, the speed limit was defined as 110 km/h or 70 mph. The concept was abandoned in 2018, with some Rapid Roads upgraded as expressways, and others becoming 2x2 lane main roads.

This is a list of previously planned Rapid Roads:

Main roads with 2x2 traffic lanes
There are several dual carriageway main road sections in Hungary, which are similar in most technological respects to expressways but allow at-grade intersections. Speed limit at designated sections of these roads is 110 km/h or 70 mph.

Road  between M3 and Gyöngyös (7 km)
Several parts of Road  between Budapest and Püspökladány (40 km) (The way between Budapest and Püspökladány is about 165 km/103miles)
Road  between M5 and Kecskemét (8 km)
Road  between Szekszárd and Tolna (4 km)
Road  between Veszprém and Székesfehérvár
Road  between Budapest and Szentendre (4 km and 9 km within the city limit of Budapest)
Road  between Hatvan and Salgótarján
Road  between Miskolc and Sajóbábony (10 km)
Road  between Békéscsaba and Gyula (11 km)
Road  between Szeged and Hódmezővásárhely (24 km)
Road  between Pécs and Pécs-Pogány International Airport (10 km)
A section of road  between Sopron and the border with Austria (4 km)
A section of road  between Egyházasrádóc and Körmend (3.5 km)

Toll requirements

Motorcars up to 3.5 tonnes 
All vehicles must have an electronic vignette to use the motorways and expressways in Hungary. Cars, vans and motorbikes up to 3.5 tonnes only need to buy a single vignette which costs 5,500 Hungarian forint (Ft) for 10 days, 8,900 Ft for 1 month and 49,190 Ft for a year. The e-vignette user charge system applies to motorcycles, passenger cars and their trailers, as well as cargo vehicles with a maximum permissible gross weight of 3.5 tonnes, campers and buses, and their trailers. These vehicles are authorized to use the Hungarian toll speedway network's roads exclusively with pre-purchased –purchased prior to entering a toll speedway section– road use authorization, i.e. e-vignettes. The amount of toll charges depends on the category of the vehicle and the type of the e-vignette. The category of the motor vehicles must be determined according to the official entry that appears in the vehicle registration certificate, based on the maximum permissible gross weight of the motor vehicle and the number of persons it is allowed to transport.

All vignettes are checked via  ANPR cameras or the police will pull a driver over and the driver will have to show a vignette via the E-vignette app or the driver will print out a sheet with the payment. If failing to buy a e-vignette the driver will face fines from 18,750 Ft to 74,970 Ft.

Hungarian system has 2 main type in terms of salary (for motorcycles, passenger cars, buses, trailers, vans up to 3.5 t):
 time-based fee vignettes (E-vigentte system)
 regional vignettes (annual vignette for Hungarian counties)

All the sections of motorways and expressways are toll roads except for these sections: 
 the following sections of the  expressway: – 63 km
 the section between Main Road 1 (exit −1) and the M5 motorway (exit 32),
 the section between M4 expressway (exit 41) and M3 motorway (exit 68),
 Megyeri Bridge (the section between Main Road 11 and Main Road 2), (exit 74–77).
 the section of the  motorway between the Miskolc-South and Miskolc-North junctions (exit 24–31)
 the  motorway – 12 km
 the section of  expressway (sign of Main Road 4) between the road leading from Vecsés to Budapest Liszt Ferenc International Airport (section between km section 19+550 and km section 20+518)
 the Pécs south-west loop section of the  motorway between roads no. 58 (exit 30) and 5826 (exit 32) – 2 km
 the section of the  expressway between Balatonszentgyörgy/Balatonberény and Keszthely‑Fenékpuszta (exit 0–8)
 the  motorway
 the  expressway – 29 km
 the section of  expressway between Main Roads 6 and 51

Vehicles over 3.5 tonnes 
Lorries have to buy an e-toll Via E-toll app to use the highways and expressways. There are different fares for lorries below 3.5 tonnes and lorries above 3.5 tonnes.

History
Development of the overall length (at the end of):

Hungarian highways network since 1964

Gallery

Opening of new highway sections 
Construction of new motorways in recent years has been hampered due to corruption scandals and austerity measures as well as owing to new European rules under which old EIA assessments lapsed. 
In the coming years, the highway network expansion focuses on connecting all major cities into the highway network, and on the completion of highways in the border region of Hungary. Construction of non-radial roads continues to be slow.

See also
 Transport in Hungary
 Roads in Hungary
 List of controlled-access highway systems
 Evolution of motorway construction in European nations

References

General
Magyarország autóatlasz (Road atlas of Hungary), Dimap-Szarvas, Budapest, 2004
Magyarország autóatlasz (Road atlas of Hungary), Dimap-Szarvas, Budapest, 2013

External links

National Toll Payment Services Plc (in Hungarian, some information also in English)
Home page of the National Toll Payment Services Plc.
Detailed map of the Hungarian motorway system (2021)